State Highway 31 (abbreviated SH-31) is a state highway in Oklahoma. It runs 132.6 miles in an irregular west-to-east pattern in the southeastern part of the state.

There are two spur highways branching from SH-31, SH-31A and SH-31B.

Route description
SH-31 begins at SH-48 seven miles (11 km) south of Tupelo. Two miles (3.2 km) east of here, SH-31B branches off, connecting the main highway with the town of Olney. Leaving Coalgate, SH-31 turns north at SH-131, traveling  to its junction with SH-31A, which connects with US-270 at Stuart. At SH-31A, SH-31 turns to the east, following the northern edge of the McAlester Army Ammunition Plant, arriving in McAlester, seat of Pittsburg County,  later.

In McAlester, SH-31 forms a five-mile (8 km) concurrency with US-270 and SH-1, splitting up just east of the US-69 interchange on the east side of the city. SH-31 then sets off to the northeast, passing through Krebs, and crossing the south arm of Lake Eufaula.

At Quinton,  from McAlester, SH-31 serves as the southern terminus of SH-71, then heads east, forming a six-mile (10 km) concurrency with SH-2 to the town of Kinta. At Kinta, SH-2 turns north, and SH-31 continues east, with a short dogleg concurrency with SH-82 at Lequire. Continuing on to the east, SH-31 serves as the southern terminus for SH-26 at McCurtain, then passes through Bokoshe before terminating at US-59/US-271, two miles (3 km) north of Panama.

Junction list

Spur routes

SH-31A

SH-31A is a  spur connecting SH-31 with US-270/SH-1 and the town of Stuart in Pittsburg and Hughes counties.

SH-31B

SH-31B is a  spur connecting SH-31 and the town of Olney in Coal County.

External links
 SH-31 at OKHighways.com

References

031
Transportation in Coal County, Oklahoma
Transportation in Pittsburg County, Oklahoma
Transportation in Hughes County, Oklahoma
Transportation in Haskell County, Oklahoma
Transportation in Le Flore County, Oklahoma